Apamea acera is a moth of the family Noctuidae. It is native to western North America, where it can be found from British Columbia south to California and east to Utah.

The wingspan is about 46 mm.

References

External links
Images

Apamea (moth)
Moths of North America
Moths described in 1900